Joseph Hilongwa Jermia (born September 18, 1981) is a boxer from Namibia, who participated in the 2004 Summer Olympics for his native African country. There he was stopped in the quarterfinals of the light flyweight (48 kg) division by Russia's eventual bronze medal winner Sergey Kazakov.

Jermia won the bronze medal in the same division one year earlier, at the All-Africa Games in Abuja, Nigeria.

References
sports-reference

1981 births
Living people
Flyweight boxers
Boxers at the 2004 Summer Olympics
Olympic boxers of Namibia
Namibian male boxers
African Games bronze medalists for Namibia
African Games medalists in boxing
Competitors at the 2003 All-Africa Games